Jalandhari is an Urdu surname. Notable people with this surname include:

 Hafeez Jalandhari (1900 – 1982), Pakistani Urdu-language poet who wrote the lyrics for the National Anthem of Pakistan.
 Muhammad Hanif Jalandhari, Pakistani Islamic scholar
 Khair Muhammad Jalandhari (1895 - 1970), Pakistani Islamic scholar
 Muhammad Ali Jalandhari (1895 - 1971), Pakistani Islamic scholar